Slant Six Games was a Canadian independent video game developer founded in 2005. The company's name is derived from the 1959 Chrysler engine of the same name. Slant Six Games' studio was based in Vancouver, British Columbia, Canada. They were voted the 7th best company to work for in British Columbia by BC Business 2011.

Slant Six Games has released three games published by Sony Computer Entertainment of America: SOCOM U.S. Navy SEALs: Tactical Strike which was named the best PSP multiplayer experience at E3 2007 and SOCOM U.S. Navy SEALs: Fireteam Bravo 3 for the PlayStation Portable as well as SOCOM U.S. Navy SEALs: Confrontation for PlayStation 3.

In March 2012, Slant Six Games launched Resident Evil: Operation Raccoon City as part of the Resident Evil franchise. The game has been called "a big success" by the publisher Capcom for shipping two million copies within two months of the release date. Resident Evil: Operation Raccoon City is Capcom's 16th best selling title.

In November 2012, Slant Six Games released their first original title The Bowling Dead for iOS devices.

In 2013, in collaboration with Microsoft, Slant Six Games released Galactic Reign. They also released Max's Pirate Planet - A Board Game Adventure that same year.

In June 2013, Slant Six Games laid off the last of their employees.

Games

Hexane Engine
Hexane is a complete game engine developed by Slant Six Games for console, PC and mobile games.

References

External links

Canadian companies established in 2005
Canadian companies disestablished in 2013
Video game companies established in 2005
Video game companies disestablished in 2013
Defunct video game companies of Canada
Companies based in Vancouver
Defunct companies of British Columbia
Video game development companies
2005 establishments in British Columbia
2013 disestablishments in British Columbia